Panchendriya  is a sonar suite that has been developed by the Defence Research and Development Organisation, India for the submarines of the Indian Navy. It has been described as India's "first indigenously developed sonar system for submarines".

History 
The system has been developed by the Naval Physical Oceanographic Laboratory, Kochi a laboratory under the DRDO in the southern Indian state of Kerala. Initial approval for the project was given in 1987 for their induction into the Navy's Foxtrot-class submarines and was further approved as a measure to shore up indigenous production in sonar technology following a review in 1990. By 1994, development of engineering models and factory testing had been completed. Further tests on the system began in 1997 on board the INS Karanj with a scheduled induction for 2002.

Features 
The Panchendriya is a composite submarine sonar and tactical weapons control system that contains active, passive, surveillance, ranging and interception sonars. It also has a submarine communications system built into it.

Deployment 
It is also part of the indigenously developed .

See also 
USHUS (sonar)

References 

Sonar
Military equipment of India
Submarine components
Indian inventions
Submarines of India